Sharga is a sum (district) of Govi-Altai Province in western Mongolia. The area has one of the last two populations of the Mongolian saiga antelope (Saiga tatarica mongolica), which is protected in Sharga Nature Reserve. In 2009, its population was 1,921.

References 

Populated places in Mongolia
Districts of Govi-Altai Province